The University of Texas Harris County Psychiatric Center (aka the UTHCPC, Harris County Psychiatric Center or HCPC is a psychiatric hospital in Harris County, Texas, that caters to the psychiatric and sometimes psychological needs of persons aged 3 and older, diagnosed with schizophrenia, bipolar disorder, depression, disruptive behavior disorders, anxiety disorders, dual diagnoses, anger, paranoia, schizoaffective disorder, personality disorders, adjustment disorders, and possibly more. The facility contains 11 patient units, including general psychiatry units as well as specialty units such as those dedicated to schizophrenia, bipolar disorder, and patients with dual diagnoses.

The facility takes patients regardless of their immigration status, race, gender, language, income, address, criminal record, whether they have a home or not, or their ability to pay for any services.

The facility provides diagnosis, limited psychotherapy, medication, referrals to MHMRA clinics where the patients can get free medication and see psychiatrists for free as well as other services.

A typical stay at the HCPC is from 7 to 10 work days, though some stay longer and in some rare cases some may stay for less than 3 days.

The HCPC accepts both voluntary and involuntary patients. The facility is for inpatients only. HCPC does not provide outpatient services, such as medication refills. Outpatients are referred to the NeuroPsychiatric Center at Ben Taub General Hospital, or to their nearest MHMRA clinic.

The facility offers church services on Sundays. On some days, it offers group therapy sessions, including recreation therapy, coping skills, depression support, and spirituality.

Staff include psychiatrists, psychologists, psych nurses, psych techs, and a chaplain.

External links
University of Texas Harris County Psychiatric Center

Institutions in the Texas Medical Center
Psychiatric hospitals in Texas